Hans Orlando Prade (23 July 1938 – 3 April 2020) was a Surinamese diplomat and politician.

After graduating from Leiden University, Prade returned to Suriname, and founded the short lived Nationale Volkspartij together with Ronald Venetiaan. Later Prade became a member of the Progressieve Nationale Partij. During the coup, Prade was a commentator on Suriname radio.

Prade served as the Surinamese ambassador to the Netherlands from 24 December 1980 until 1 June 1982. His political and undiplomatic statements were not appreciated by the regime and he was dismissed on 1 June 1982.

In 1991, he tried to run for President of Suriname, but lost out to his former college friend Venetiaan.

In 1998, Prade retired and decided to live with his family in Rotterdam, the Netherlands.

Prade died on 3 April 2020 in Rotterdam, the Netherlands due to COVID-19, aged 81.

References

External links

1938 births
2020 deaths
Place of birth missing
Leiden University alumni
Ambassadors of Suriname to the Netherlands
Deaths from the COVID-19 pandemic in the Netherlands